Mikey Lee (born 1993) is an Irish hurler who plays as a centre-forward for the Wicklow senior team.

Born in Bray, County Wicklow, Lee first arrived on the inter-county scene when he first linked up with the Wicklow minor team, before later lining out with the under-21 side. He made his senior debut in the 2013 National Hurling League. Lee has since gone on to play a key role for the team, and has won one National League (Division 2B) medal. He has been a Christy Ring Cup runner-up on one occasion.

At club level Lee plays with Upperchurch–Drombane, Co. Tipperary and formerly with  Bray Emmets Co Wicklow.

Honours

Team

Wicklow
National League (Division 2B) (1): 2014
All-Ireland Minor C Hurling Championship (1): 2011

References

1993 births
Living people
Wicklow hurlers
Bray Emmets hurlers
Upperchurch-Drombane hurlers